Thomas Mercer Jones (1795 – 2 October 1868) was an English-born administrator who arrived in Upper Canada in the 1820s and was employed as a commissioner of the Canada Company based in Goderich. A series of internal conflicts led to his dismissal in 1852. He died in Toronto.

External links 
 Biography at the Dictionary of Canadian Biography Online

1795 births
1868 deaths
English emigrants to pre-Confederation Ontario
Immigrants to Upper Canada